The 2004 season was the New York Giants' 80th in the National Football League (NFL). After starting the season 5–2 the Giants lost eight games in a row before winning the final game of the season to finish 6–10, good enough for second place in the NFC East by tiebreaker.

Off-season
Former Jacksonville Jaguars head coach Tom Coughlin was hired to replace Jim Fassel, who was fired following the conclusion of the 2003 season.
Departures: Kerry Collins, Brian Mitchell, Dorsey Levens, Chris Bober, Kenny Holmes, Cornelius Griffin, Keith Hamilton, Brandon Short, Dhani Jones, Michael Barrow, Ryan Clark, Matt Bryant.

NFL draft

The Giants' poor record for 2003 resulted in their being tied with the San Diego Chargers, the Oakland Raiders and the Arizona Cardinals for the worst record in the league. By virtue of a series of tiebreakers, the Giants landed at the fourth pick in the draft and were forecast to select Robert Gallery, an offensive tackle from Iowa, or Ben Roethlisberger, a quarterback from Miami of Ohio, with the pick. Another scenario was also listed as a possibility, and would prove to be the move the Giants would make.

Entering the draft, the consensus top pick was Ole Miss quarterback Eli Manning. However, Manning had said prior to the draft that he did not want to play for the Chargers and would not sign with them if he was drafted. The Chargers would strike a deal with the Giants before the draft that would shape the future of both franchises. The Chargers would select Manning first overall, as they had intended to. The Giants would then draft quarterback Philip Rivers of North Carolina State, and then swap him and two 2005 draft picks for Manning. 

The Giants also selected former Boston College offensive guard Chris Snee, Auburn linebacker Reggie Torbor, and strong safety Gibril Wilson.

Undrafted free agents

Roster

Regular season
Although the Giants had traded for Eli Manning, the season began with veteran quarterback and former league MVP Kurt Warner as the starter.  After a season-opening loss to the Philadelphia Eagles, Warner and the Giants enjoyed surprising success, starting a four-game winning streak that included road victories over the Dallas Cowboys and Green Bay Packers.  Following a Halloween rout of the Minnesota Vikings, 34–14, the Giants were 5–2, trailing the then-undefeated Philadelphia Eagles by just two games.

The high-water mark of the Giants season came on November 7, when the Giants led the Bears 14–0 at the end of the first quarter.  Over the rest of the game, though, the Giants turned the ball over five times, allowed the Bears to score 28 unanswered points (20 in the second quarter) and lost by a score of 28–21.  After another loss, this time on the road against the Arizona Cardinals, Giants coach Tom Coughlin decided to replace Warner with Manning.  The decision did not show immediate success, as the Giants turned the ball over ten times in the next four games, scoring a total of 37 points.

Close losses to the Pittsburgh Steelers and the Bengals followed, dropping the Giants to 5–10.  The season did end with a slight possibility of succeeding, as the Giants rallied from a 16–7 fourth quarter deficit to end the season with a 28–24 victory over division rival Dallas Cowboys.  Manning threw two fourth-quarter touchdown passes, and Tiki Barber scored the game winner. The Giants finished 6–10, in a three-way tie for 2nd place in the NFC East with the Cowboys and the Redskins.

Schedule

Game summaries

Week 1

Week 2

Standings

See also
List of New York Giants seasons

Notes and references

New York Giants seasons
New York Giants
New York Giants season
21st century in East Rutherford, New Jersey
Meadowlands Sports Complex